Markinez (Marquínez in Spanish or Markiz in Basque) is a village and council located in the municipality of Bernedo, in Álava province, Basque Country, Spain. As of 2020, it has a population of 61.

Geography 
Marquínez is located 31km south-southeast of Vitoria-Gasteiz.

References

Populated places in Álava